The 1991–92 Santosh Trophy was the 48th edition of the Santosh Trophy, the main State competition for football in India. It was held in Coimbatore, Tamil Nadu. Kerala defeated Goa 3–0 in the final. It was the second title for Kerala which had lost in the finals in the previous four years.

Quarter-final

Group 1

Group 2

Group 3

Group4

Semi-finals 
After saving the fifth penalty by I. M. Vijayan, Kerala goalkeeper Sivadasan took and scored from the final kick for Kerala.

Final 
The brother of Goa goalkeeper Brahmanand Sankhwalkar died a day before the final. He was not informed of this until after the match.

References

External links 
 India 1992 at Rec.Sport.Soccer Statistics Foundation

Santosh Trophy seasons
1991–92 in Indian football